TKW may indicate:
 Total known weight
 Teck Whye LRT station (LRT station abbreviation TKW)
 Tekin Airport 
 To Kwa Wan station (MTR station code TKW)
 Thousand-kernel weight, the weight in grams of a thousand kernels (grains, seeds) of a given crop sample.